is a Japanese manga artist. His most famous works are Go!! Southern Ice Hockey Club, Katteni Kaizō, Sayonara, Zetsubou-Sensei, and Joshiraku. The bulk of Kumeta's work was published in Weekly Shōnen Sunday, until the abrupt cancellation of Katteni Kaizō, which resulted in him transferring from Shogakukan to Kodansha. As of 2014, he has gone freelance. His most recent serializations were Studio Pulp for Rakuen Le Paradis of Hakusensha and Kakushigoto in Monthly Shōnen Magazine, both of which concluded their run in 2020.

Sayonara, Zetsubou-Sensei was his first work to be adapted into an anime and was awarded the 31st Kodansha Manga Award in the shōnen category.

Works

Manga

, story

, story

Anime
, original character design

Assistants
Kenjiro Hata
Maeda-kun (also known as MAEDAX, MAEDAX G, MAEDAX Roman)

References

External links
 Kōji Kumeta at Websunday.net's Back Stage 
 Weekly Shōnen Magazine: Sayonara Zetsubō Sensei official site

 
1967 births
Manga artists from Kanagawa Prefecture
Winner of Kodansha Manga Award (Shōnen)
People from Yokosuka, Kanagawa
Living people
Wako University alumni